Jangan Lupa Lirik! or JLL! is a Malaysian quiz show format of Don't Forget the Lyrics! with a jackpot of RM 1,000,000. It is currently shown on Astro Ria since April 28, 2008.

Merdeka Edition 

The Merdeka edition was produced in 2008 and the proceedings were made for charity. The contestants from the edition were all well-known artists which is:

Mila (AF5)
Zahid (AF2)
Salih Yaakob (Actor, DJ Sinar FM, Presenter)

Raya Edition 

The Raya edition was produced in 2009 and proceedings were made for charity. The contestants were also well-known artists which is:
 Siti Nurhaliza (Singer)
 Saiful Apek (Actor, Singer, Presenter)
 Amy Mastura (Actress, Singer, Presenter, Model)
 Adibah Noor (Actress, Singer, Presenter)

Plot Lyric color 

Lyric unfilled and not yet to be locked  e.g. = _ _ _ _
Lyric locked e.g. =  Aku Cinta Pada Mu
Green color which means correct lyric e.g. =  Aku Cinta Pada Mu
Red color which means wrong lyric e.g. =  Pada Mu Aku Cinta

Prizes

Record Jangan Lupa Lirik by year

Lifelines Option 

 Backup - In the option, the player will choose the either one or two backups to help sing the difficult lyrics.
 Open 2 lyrics - The player will give his or her chance to open two lyrics to look if the lyrics were correct.
 Objective - The player will choose the either three objective forms which contains different lyrics.

New concept season 2

 From the first episode of the second season, the player will have one unprofessional singer from either Friend or Family and one professional singer which is the show's guest appearance.

Back-up (Celebrity) Season-2

Back-up (Celebrity) Season-3

Don't Forget the Lyrics!
Malaysian game shows
Television series by Banijay
2008 Malaysian television series debuts
2011 Malaysian television series endings
Astro Ria original programming